Lombard is a village in DuPage County, Illinois, United States, and a suburb of Chicago. The population was 44,476 at the 2020 census.

History

Originally part of Potawatomi Native American landscape, the Lombard area was first settled by Americans of European descent in the 1830s. Lombard shares its early history with Glen Ellyn. Brothers Ralph and Morgan Babcock settled in a grove of trees along the DuPage River. In what was known as Babcock's Grove, Lombard developed to the east and Glen Ellyn to the west. In 1837, Babcock's Grove was connected to Chicago by a stagecoach line which stopped at Stacy's Tavern at Geneva and St. Charles Roads. Fertile land, the DuPage River, and plentiful timber drew farmers to the area.

Sheldon and Harriet Peck moved from Onondaga, New York, to this area in 1837 to farm  of land. In addition, Peck was an artist and primitive portrait painter who traveled to clients across northeastern Illinois. The Peck house also served as the area's first school and has been restored by the Lombard Historical Society.
In 2011, the Peck House was inducted into the National Park Service's Network to Freedom—a list of verified Underground Railroad locations.

The 1848 arrival of the Galena and Chicago Union Railroad provided local farmers and merchants rail access to Chicago, and commercial buildings soon sprang up around the train station. Lombard was officially incorporated in 1869, named after Chicago banker and real estate developer Josia Lewis Lombard.

Women's rights
On April 6, 1891, Ellen A. Martin led a group of women to the voting place at the general store. She demanded that the three male election judges allow the women to vote. The judges were so surprised that one of them had a "spasm," one leaned against the wall for support, and the other fell backwards into a barrel of flour. They acquiesced to Ellen, but fundamentally did not want to let the women vote, so a county judge was asked to decide. He agreed that the women were right. Ellen Martin then became the first woman in Illinois to vote, and one of the first in the entire U.S. In 1916 Illinois women could vote in national elections, but the 19th Amendment (the Women's Suffrage Amendment) was not passed until 1920.

In 2008, Lombard declared April 6 to be "Ellen Martin Day" in commemoration of Ms. Martin's historic victory for women's suffrage.

Little Orphan Annie House
William LeRoy built a home in the Italianate style on Lombard's Main Street in 1881. LeRoy specialized in making artificial limbs for civil war veterans and lived in this house until 1900. The house would eventually become the home of Harold Gray's parents and the studio of Harold Gray, the originator of Little Orphan Annie cartoon strip. Harold Gray used the home's study to work on the Annie cartoons, and some features of the house are drawn into some of his cartoons, such as the grand staircase and the outer deck. Gray lived at 215 S. Stewart Ave in Lombard at this time. Later, he remarried and moved to the east coast. Harold Gray was a charter member of Lombard Masonic Lodge #1098, A.F. & A.M. in 1923.

The Lilac Village
In 1927, the estate of Colonel William Plum, a local resident, was bequeathed to the village. The Plum property included his home, which became the Helen M. Plum Memorial Library, and a large garden containing 200 varieties of lilac bushes. This garden became a public park, Lilacia Park.

Lilac Festival
Since 1930, Lombard has hosted an annual Lilac Festival and parade in May. "Lilac Time in Lombard," is a 16-day festival ending in mid-May. It starts with the Lilac Queen coronation and her court. Many lilac themed events take place, including a formal ball, concerts, wine and beer tasting in the park, a Mothers' Day Brunch, an arts and crafts fair, and tours of the park.  The grand finale is Lombard's Lilac Festival Parade. The first Lilac Princess in 1930 was Adeline Fleege.

Education
Lombard's high schools (9-12) belong to Glenbard Township High School District 87. They are shared with the neighboring town of Glen Ellyn, thus the creation of the portmanteau word "Glenbard". Lombard's elementary and middle schools (K-8) belong to Lombard School District 44  or DuPage School District 45.

High Schools
Glenbard East High School (located in Lombard)
 Serves the majority of Lombard.
Glenbard South High School (located in Glen Ellyn)
 Serves the far southwest part of Lombard.
Glenbard West High School (located in Glen Ellyn)
 Serves the far northwest part of Lombard.
Willowbrook High School (located in Villa Park)
 Serves the southeast and far northeast part of Lombard.
Addison Trail High School (located in Addison)
Serves parts of unincorporated Lombard.
Private Schools
Montini Catholic High School
College Preparatory School of America

Village government

The Village of Lombard is a non-home rule community. It has a council–manager form of government. Each elective office is held for a four-year term.

Village President: Keith Giagnorio
Village Clerk: Liz Brezinski
Trustee, District 1: Brian LaVaque
Trustee, District 2: Anthony Puccio
Trustee, District 3: Bernie Dudek
Trustee, District 4: Andrew Honig
Trustee, District 5: Daniel Militello
Trustee, District 6: Bob Bachner

Geography
Lombard is located at  (41.875979, -88.015060).

Demographics

As of the 2020 census there were 44,476 people, 17,030 households, and 10,914 families residing in the village. The racial makeup of the village was 70.83% White, 4.62% African American, 0.35% Native American, 13.15% Asian, 0.01% Pacific Islander, 3.82% from other races, and 7.21% from two or more races. Hispanic or Latino of any race were 10.17% of the population.

There were 17,030 households, out of which 47.30% had children under the age of 18 living with them, 51.20% were married couples living together, 9.82% had a female householder with no husband present, and 35.91% were non-families. 29.47% of all households were made up of individuals, and 11.30% had someone living alone who was 65 years of age or older. The average household size was 3.23 and the average family size was 2.54.

The village's age distribution consisted of 20.4% under the age of 18, 9.0% from 18 to 24, 29% from 25 to 44, 25.8% from 45 to 64, and 15.7% who were 65 years of age or older. The median age was 37.7 years. For every 100 females, there were 93.0 males. For every 100 females age 18 and over, there were 91.7 males.

The median income for a household in the village was $86,167, and the median income for a family was $100,420. Males had a median income of $58,398 versus $40,411 for females. The per capita income for the village was $41,154. About 3.5% of families and 5.6% of the population were below the poverty line, including 4.5% of those under age 18 and 5.9% of those age 65 or over.

Economy
According to Lombard's 2020 Comprehensive Annual Financial Report, the top employers in the city are:

Transportation

Lombard is served by Metra's Union Pacific/West Line, which runs from the Ogilvie Transportation Center out to Elburn, Illinois over the old Chicago and Northwestern Railway trackage. Lombard's also served by I-88 / Illinois 110 and I-355 as well as Illinois Routes 38, 53, 56, and 64.

Formerly, it was also served by trains of the Chicago Aurora and Elgin Railroad (with commuter stops at Stewart Ave, Main St, Brewster Ave and Westmore/Meyers Road) and the Chicago Great Western Railway. These former railroads have been preserved as multiple use recreational trails (Illinois Prairie Path and Great Western Trail).

Notable people

 Winifred Bonfils, newspaper journalist and columnist
 Ted Kaczynski, American terrorist, also known as the Unabomber
 Harold Gray, cartoonist and creator of Little Orphan Annie
Tom Higgenson, founder of Plain White T's, grew up in Lombard
 James Marcello, reputed Mafia leader
 Ellen Annette Martin, first woman to vote in Illinois in 1891
 Mary Elizabeth Mastrantonio, actor
 Sheldon Peck, folk artist and abolitionist
 Mary Doria Russell, author of five novels including The Sparrow and Children of God
 Daniel M. Tani, NASA astronaut
 Charles Tilly, scholar
 Doug Walker, film critic and comedian
 Timothy Zahn, science-fiction author

References

External links

 Official Website
 National University of Health Sciences
 The Lombardian, "A Lombard Newspaper for Lombard People"
 The Lombard Spectator
 The Maple Street Chapel Preservation Society
 The Lombard Historical Society
 Lombard Masonic Lodge No.1098 AF&AM

 
Villages in Illinois
Chicago metropolitan area
Villages in DuPage County, Illinois
Populated places established in 1869
1869 establishments in Illinois